Peirce College is a private college in Philadelphia, Pennsylvania. It focuses on adult learners.

History

In 1865, Thomas May Peirce, a Philadelphia educator, founded the Union Business College. The curriculum was designed to provide returning Civil War soldiers a business-focused education in anticipation of post-war business growth and expansion. Different from many colleges and universities of the era, Union was co-educational at its founding. Originally housed within Handel and Haydn Hall on Spring Garden Street, the college moved to its present location at 1420 Pine Street in 1915. In 1917, the school was renamed the Peirce School of Business Administration.

In 1964 Peirce School was renamed Peirce Junior College as it received approval to grant associate degrees. In 1997 the college was approved to grant Bachelor of Science degrees and was renamed Peirce College. In 2000 the college began offering online courses.

The Pine Street facilities have twice been awarded the General Building Contractors Association's Best Institutional Project in the under $5 million category; in 2001 for improvements made to College Hall, and in 2011 for the new Library.

In September 2022, after 107 years at 1420 Pine Street, the college announced it was moving its main campus to the 19th Floor of 1608 Chestnut Street.

Academics

Peirce currently has undergraduate programs in Business, Healthcare, Information Technology, General Studies, and Paralegal Studies. The college offers graduate programs in Healthcare Administration and Organizational Leadership and Management.

Within the Business Administration degree concentrations are offered in accounting, entrepreneurship/small business, human resource management, marketing, and real estate management. The Information Technology degree offers concentrations in desktop applications for business, information security, network administration, network security, technology management, and programming and application development.

Peirce has specialized educational programs for those who wish to seek an accelerated education during the evening and weekend on campus, earn their degree online, or earn their degree while at work (The Peirce Corporate College). Most courses are in an accelerated 7-week format, with some general education and paralegal courses following a standard 14-week format. Peirce uses a 3 semester calendar (fall, spring and summer) with two 7-week courses or one 14-week course each semester.

The college is accredited by the Middle States Commission on Higher Education.

The School District of Philadelphia and Peirce have a partner program which provides an off-campus general studies degree program for parents with children enrolled in Philadelphia public schools.

Notable alumni
Charli Baltimore, Grammy-nominated American rapper–songwriter
Clair Blank, author, Beverly Gray mystery series
Benjamin Guggenheim, business person 
Simon Guggenheim, U.S. Senator representing Colorado, 1907–1913.
Arthur Seligman, Governor of New Mexico
James A. Gallagher, U.S. Congressman from Pennsylvania
Anastasio Somoza, President of Nicaragua, 1936–1956
Christine Tartaglione, Democratic member of the Pennsylvania State Senate, representing the 2nd District since 1995
Bill Tilden, U.S. tennis champion

References

External links

Peirce College
Educational institutions established in 1865
Rittenhouse Square, Philadelphia
1865 establishments in Pennsylvania
Private universities and colleges in Pennsylvania
Central High School (Philadelphia) alumni